Panaqolus nocturnus, known as the dusky panaque, is a species of small catfish in the family Loricariidae found in the Santiago and Pastaza River basins in the upper Napo drainage in tropical South America.

References

Ancistrini
Catfish of South America
Fish of Brazil
Endemic fauna of Brazil
Taxa named by Scott Allen Schaefer
Taxa named by Donald J. Stewart
Fish described in 1993